Sparganothis taracana is a species of moth of the family Tortricidae. It is found in the United States, including Florida, South Carolina and Texas.

The wingspan is 13–17 mm.

References

Moths described in 1884
Sparganothis